"The Birds of Africa" is also a five-volume handbook by George Ernest Shelley, published 1896-1912.

The Birds of Africa is an eight-volume ornithological handbook. 
Its authors/editors are C. Hilary Fry, Stuart Keith and Emil Urban, and each volume contains colour plates painted by Martin Woodcock

Content

It covers all breeding species in full, with details of range, status, description, voice, general habits and breeding; non-breeding visitors are treated more briefly, with emphasis on their status and behaviour whilst in Africa.

Volumes

The series contained the following volumes:
 Ostriches to Falcons, published in 1982  521 pp.
 Gamebirds to Pigeons, published in 1986  552 pp. + 32 color plates
 Parrots to Woodpeckers, published in 1988  611 pp. + 32 color plates
 Broadbills to Chats, published in 1992 609 pp. + 32 color plates
 Thrushes to Puffback Flycatchers, published in  1997  669 pp. + 32color plates
 Picathartes to Oxpeckers, published in  2000  724 pp. + 36 color plates
 Sparrows to Buntings, published in 2004  666 pp. 
 The Malagasy Region, published 2013  1024 pp.

References

Ornithological handbooks